The Serbian National Theatre, located in Novi Sad, is one of the major theatres of Serbia.

History
The current building of the theatre was opened in March 1981. The Serbian National Theatre was founded in 1861 during a conference of the Serbian National Theatre Society, composed of members of the Serbian Reading Room (Srpska čitaonica), held in Novi Sad. The first general manager of the Serbian National Theatre was Jovan Đorđević and the second was Dimitrije Mihailović. The founding fathers were: Dr. Jovan Andrejević-Joles, Svetozar Miletić, Stevan Branovački, Jovan Jovanović Zmaj, Jovan Đorđević, Dimitrije Ružić, Dimitrije Marković Kikinđanin, Nikola Nedeljković, Dimitrije Mihailović, Kosta Hadžić, Mihailo Gavrilović, Mihailo Racković, Mladen Cvijić, Stevan Čekić and Draginja Popović-Ružić.

An annual theatre festival Sterijino pozorje is held in Serbian National Theatre since 1956.

Gallery

See also
 Youth Theatre
 Novi Sad Theatre
 List of theatres in Serbia

External links

Serbian National Theatre

 

1861 establishments in Serbia
Opera houses in Serbia
Theatres in Novi Sad
Culture in Novi Sad
Culture of Vojvodina
Buildings and structures in Novi Sad
National theatres
Theatres completed in 1861
Theatres completed in 1981